Christchurch is the largest city in the South Island of New Zealand. 

Christchurch  may also refer to:

Places
 Christchurch, New Zealand
Christchurch (New Zealand electorate), a former electorate in New Zealand, also called Town (or City) of Christchurch
 Christchurch Central, the current electorate of Christchurch in New Zealand
 Christchurch mosque shootings, a 2019 terrorist attack in Christchurch, New Zealand
 Christchurch, Cambridgeshire, in England
 Christchurch, Dorset, town on the south coast of England
 RAF Christchurch, a WW II airfield near the town
 Christchurch (UK Parliament constituency), England, centred on the town
Christchurch (Dorset) railway station, a railway station serving the town
 Christchurch, Gloucestershire, hamlet in the west of the Forest of Dean, Gloucestershire, England
 Christchurch, Newport, in Wales
 Christchurch, Virginia, United States
 Christchurch Mansion, a stately home in Ipswich, Suffolk
Christchurch Park, a park surrounding Christchurch Mansion
Christ Church, Barbados, Barbados
Southwark Christchurch, England

Educational institutions
 Canterbury Christ Church University
 Christchurch School, Christchurch, Virginia, U.S.
 Christchurch Boys' High School, Christchurch, New Zealand
 Christchurch Girls' High School, Christchurch, New Zealand
 Christ Church, Oxford
 University of Otago Christchurch School of Medicine, one of three medical schools of University of Otago, New Zealand
 Christchurch Anglo-Indian Higher Secondary School, Christchurch, Chennai, India

Sports teams
 Christchurch F.C., England
 Christchurch United, New Zealand
 Christchurch Technical, New Zealand
 Christchurch High School Old Boys, New Zealand

Other uses
 Christchurch-Campbell, an automobile made in 1922
 ChristChurch London, an evangelic church in London, UK
 Christchurch the Music, 2005 compilation album from New Zealand

See also
 Christ Church (disambiguation)
 Christ Church Cathedral (disambiguation)
 Church of Christ (disambiguation)
 Christian Church (disambiguation)
 Christchurch railway station (disambiguation)